The Annie Award for Best General Audience Animated Television Broadcast Production is an Annie Award, awarded annually to the best adult animated television/broadcasting productions.

The categories for television/broadcasting productions have gone through several name changes and divisions:
 From 1992 to 1997, there was only one award named Best Animated Television Program
 In 1998, the award was split into two categories, Outstanding Achievement in an Animated Daytime Television Program and Outstanding Achievement in an Animated Primetime or Late Night Television Program, but was eventually combined into one category again.
 In 2001, the award received an offshoot category, the Best Animated Television Production for Children award, though the category was not presented regularly until 2007.
 In 2011, the awards for television productions were split into their current division based on the audience of the program, establishing three categories, Best General Audience Animated Television Production, Best Animated Television Production for Children and Best Animated Television Production for Preschool.

Winners and nominees

2010s

2020s

Best Mature Audience Animated Television/Broadcast Production

See also
 Primetime Emmy Award for Short-Format Animation
 Critics' Choice Television Award for Best Animated Series
 Primetime Emmy Award for Outstanding Animated Program

References

External links
 Annie Awards: Legacy

Annie Awards
American television awards
Awards established in 2011
2011 establishments in the United States